Kim Seung-yong (Hangul: 김승용; Hanja: 金承龍; born 14 March 1985) is a former South Korean professional footballer.

He has also played in Australia, Japan, China and Thailand during his career.

Career statistics

Club

Honours

Club
Ulsan Hyundai
 AFC Champions League: 2012

International
 AFC U-19 Championship: 2004

References

External links

 Kim Seung-yong – National Team stats at KFA 

 

1985 births
Living people
Association football forwards
South Korean footballers
FC Seoul players
Gimcheon Sangmu FC players
Jeonbuk Hyundai Motors players
Gamba Osaka players
Ulsan Hyundai FC players
Qingdao F.C. players
Kim Seung-yong
Gangwon FC players
Incheon United FC players
Tai Po FC players
Lee Man FC players
K League 1 players
Footballers at the 2008 Summer Olympics
Olympic footballers of South Korea
Footballers from Seoul
J1 League players
A-League Men players
China League One players
Kim Seung-yong
Hong Kong Premier League players
Expatriate footballers in China
Expatriate footballers in Japan
Expatriate soccer players in Australia
Expatriate footballers in Thailand
Expatriate footballers in Hong Kong
South Korean expatriate footballers
South Korean expatriate sportspeople in China
South Korean expatriate sportspeople in Japan
South Korean expatriate sportspeople in Australia
South Korean expatriate sportspeople in Thailand
South Korean expatriate sportspeople in Hong Kong